Chehraa (English: Face), is an Indian Hindi thriller film, released on 18 February 2005, starring Bipasha Basu, Dino Morea, Preeti Jhangiani, and Irrfan Khan. The film is directed by Saurabh Shukla. This movie is Saurabh Shukla's second directorial movie after his debut movie Mudda - The Issue.

Synopsis
Reena (Preeti Jhangiani) and fellow collegian Akash Mehta (Dino Morea) are medical (psychiatry) students. They are sweethearts and hope to marry after completing their education. Before that could happen, Megha Joshi (Bipasha Basu) enters their lives and changes everything. For Akash falls head over heels in love with her, and will do anything for her. Just when their education is about to get over, Megha disappears from Akash's life for the spectacular task of killing her father to save her mentally challenged mother.

Meanwhile, Aakash becomes a psychiatrist with Reena in the same hospital. Five years later, Megha is admitted in the Psychiatric Ward of the same hospital in a very disturbed condition. She is unable to recollect anything except her last day with Akash, when both had planned to marry each other. Watch how Akash comes to term with his lost love, and promises to do his best to unravel the mystery that is Megha and her equally mysterious disappearance, and her sudden re-appearance in his life. Megha is married to Chandranath Diwan (Irrfan Khan), a very rich drug addict. Megha claims she gets threatening calls and that somebody is trying to kill her.

Soundtrack
"Mausam Ki Izazat Hai" - Shreya Ghoshal, Kunal Ganjawala
"Kabhi Khamosh Baithogi" - Mahalakshmi Iyer, Babul Supriyo
"Had Se Jyada Sanam Tujhse Pyar Kiya" - Sonu Nigam
"Khushbu Khayal Hu Ke Hawa Aajma KeDekh" - Alka Yagnik
"Chillake Chillake" - Viva
"Chillake Chillake (remix)" - Viva
"Tabahi Tabahi" - Alisha Chinai

Reception
Rediff.com gave a scathing review of the film, calling it "a drag" and "a waste of time". Likewise, Taran Adarsh of IndiaFM labelled it "a weak fare with poor prospects".

References

External links 

2005 films
2000s Hindi-language films
2005 thriller films
Films scored by Anu Malik
Films scored by Nikhil-Vinay
Films scored by Naresh Sharma
Films scored by Ram Sampath
Indian thriller films
Hindi-language thriller films